Salamiyah is a district (mantiqah) administratively belonging to Hama Governorate, Syria. At the 2004 Census it had a population of 187,123. Its administrative district is the city of Salamiyah.

Sub-districts
The district of Salamiyah is divided into five sub-districts or Nāḥiyas (population according to 2004 official census):
Salamiyah Subdistrict (ناحية سَلَمْيَة): population 115,300.
Barri Sharqi Subdistrict (ناحية بري الشرقي): population 13,767.
Al-Saan Subdistrict (ناحية السعن): population 14,366.
Sabburah Subdistrict (ناحية صبورة): population 21,900.
Uqayribat Subdistrict (ناحية عقيربات): population 21,004.

References